Jeong Dong-uk (Korean: 정동욱; born October 7, 1992), better known by his stage name, Penomeco (Korean: 페노메코), is a South Korean rapper and singer-songwriter. He released his debut single "Right There" on October 16, 2014. He also released his first extended play, Garden, on December 20, 2018. In June that same year, he was crowned the final winner of the Mnet music battle show Breakers. He is a member of the hip-hop crew Fanxy Child with Zico, Crush, Dean, Millic and Staytuned.

On June 28, 2020, Penomeco announced that he has parted ways with Million Market, following the end of his 4-year contract. On April 20, 2021, it was revealed that he signed with P Nation and released his second extended play, Dry Flower, on the same day.

Discography

Albums

Extended plays

Collaboration albums

Singles

As a featured artist

Collaborations

Guest appearances

Music credits

Filmography

Television

References

External links
 Penomeco on Instagram
 Penomeco on SoundCloud
 Penomeco's channel on YouTube

1992 births
Living people
South Korean male rappers
South Korean hip hop singers
21st-century South Korean male  singers